Learning about Forests (LEAF) is one of the five programs run by the Foundation for Environmental Education (FEE), a non-governmental organization located in Copenhagen, Denmark. LEAF aims to encourage school classes and teachers to use forests for educational activities. The vision is to see an increased level of awareness and knowledge the key role the forest plays on our planet. The program's mission is to spread environmental education concerning forests and all their values among school children all around the world.

Member organizations
In August 2013, LEAF was composed of twenty-one organizations:

References

External links
 Official Website
 Foundation for Environmental Education

Environmental education
Forestry in Europe